Salameh-ye Sofla (also Romanized as Salāmeh-ye Soflá and Salāmeh Soflá; also known as Salāmat, Salāmeh, and Salāmeh-ye Pā’īn) is a village in Dorunak Rural District, Zeydun District, Behbahan County, Khuzestan Province, Iran. At the 2006 census, its population was 70, in 14 families.

References 

Populated places in Behbahan County